From 1969 to 2007 Livingston College was one of the residential colleges that comprised Rutgers, The State University of New Jersey's undergraduate liberal arts programs. It was located on Livingston Campus (originally Kilmer) in Piscataway, New Jersey. In the Fall of 2007 the New Brunswick-area liberal arts undergraduate colleges, including Livingston College, merged into one School of Arts and Sciences of Rutgers University.

History

Named after William Livingston, the first post-colonial governor of New Jersey, Livingston College opened in 1969 as the first coeducational, residential, liberal arts college at the New Brunswick-Piscataway campuses of Rutgers, The State University of New Jersey. (The college's official founding date of 1965, seen in its "Strength Through Diversity" logo, reflects when Rutgers committed to opening the college, which occurred four years later.)

The University states: "Livingston embodied the spirit of social responsibility and cultural awareness demanded by students of the time." The College was created in response to the socio-political changes in the United States during the 1960s, including addressing the needs of African-American and Puerto Rican students as well as of non-traditional white students that well not well served by Rutgers College and Douglass College. It was seen as a "safe" experimental college because it was part of a 200-year-old university. Livingston College established several academic departments at Rutgers University including Journalism, and Urban Studies and Planning.

Like the other former liberal arts colleges—Douglass College, Rutgers College, University College (Rutgers University), and the liberal arts facet of Cook College—Livingston College maintained requirements for admission, good standing, and graduation distinct from the other colleges. In 1982 Rutgers merged the faculties from these various colleges into a new Faculty of Arts and Sciences. By the turn of the century, many in the University's community questioned whether these multiple colleges and their disparate academic requirements had become redundant and inefficient. Livingston College ceased to exist with a 2007 merger which created the School of Arts and Sciences, but students who had enrolled prior to the merger still earned Livingston College degrees until the college's final graduation ceremony in May 2010.

Academics

Livingston College offered its students over 60 majors to choose from, with a focus on liberal arts.

Honors program

Livingston College invited students to apply, or selected students based upon grades, into the Livingston College Honors Program.  The honors program was led by the honors dean of the college.  Honors students were required to take honors colloquia courses in addition to their required, general undergraduate coursework.  By the end of a traditional four-year undergraduate degree, honors students were also expected to complete an undergraduate honors thesis.

In 2007, the Livingston College Honors Program, along with the other honors programs of Rutgers University's colleges, merged into the School of Arts and Sciences (SAS) Honors Program.

Notable alumni
 Bill Bellamy (1989)—comedian
 Avery Brooks (1973)—actor (Spenser: For Hire, Star Trek: Deep Space Nine) and professor of Mason Gross School of the Arts.
 Thomas F. Daley (1975)—appellate judge, Louisiana circuit court
 Michael DuHaime (1995)—Republican strategist, deputy campaign manager and political director for Senator John McCain's 2008 presidential campaign
 Gerard Gallucci (1973)—US diplomat and UN peacekeeper
 Mark Helias (1974)—jazz musician
 John S. Lipori (1977)—Exec. VP and Chief Trust Officer, The Bank of New York
 Pedro Guanikeyu Torres (1973-1977) Is a Native American Tribal Government Representative and a Taino Native American Indian Civil Rights activist and former Native Actor (1973–76) with the Livingston College Guazabara Theater Group, was first Native American Indian to graduate in 1977 in full Native American ceremonial regalia, Star Ledger Newspaper article "A Cap of a Different Color".
Lisa Naugle (1977)—dance improvisor and choreographer
 Phil Sellers (1976)—NBA basketball player for the Detroit Pistons
 Byron Scott (1981) Broadcast Journalist with 1010WINS, WHYY-TV-12, National Black Network Radio, Fox 61 WTIC, WPHL 17 Philadelphia, PA, WCAU NBC10 Philthe a. PA, WWOR-TV, FOX 5 New York, The Washington Afro-American Newspaper
 Gregg Spiridellis (1993)—co-owner of JibJab Media
 Kurt Sutter (1986)—American screenwriter, director, producer, and actor. Creator of Sons of Anarchy
 Harry Swayne (1990)—NFL football player
 Javier (Jay) Torres (1973-1978)—Colonel, USAF - Master Pilot and Commanding Officer, Desert Storm F-15 Eagle strike forces; Senior Military Diplomatic Officer to US Ambassador (USSR) during collapse; Strategic Planning Director, JCS/SIOP Strategic Nuclear Forces; Founder/President, White Eagle Strategic Technologies LLC (London-Rome-Brussels)

Notable faculty
 Nikki Giovanni—poet 
 Barbara Benary—ethnomusicologist
 Philip Corner—composer
 Daniel Goode—composer
 Geoffrey Hendricks—artist
 Wheeler Winston Dixon—filmmaker

References

External links
A 2004 article on merging Rutgers and Livingston Colleges from the Daily Targum student newspaper
 Livingston Legacy 
 History of the College 
 Experiment Perilous: The First Year of Livingston College of Rutgers University, 1969–1970, Irving Louis Horowitz, Urban Education (1980)   

Rutgers University